Baseball at the 2014 Asian Games was held in Incheon, South Korea from September 22 to 28, 2014. Only a men's competition was held. All games were played at the Munhak Baseball Stadium and the Mokdong Baseball Stadium.

Schedule

Medalists

Draw
The teams were distributed according to their position at the IBAF World Rankings.

Group A

Group B

Squads

Results
All times are Korea Standard Time (UTC+09:00)

Preliminary round

Group A

Group B

Final round

Semifinals

Bronze medal match

Gold medal match

Final standing

References
Results

External links
Official website

 
2014
2014 Asian Games
2014 Asian Games events
Asian Games